The following lists events that happened during 1876 in Chile.

Incumbents
President of Chile: Federico Errázuriz Zañartu (until September 18), Aníbal Pinto

Events

January
 16 January Chilean International Exhibition closes

June
15 June - Chilean presidential election, 1876

Births
6 July - Luis Emilio Recabarren (d. 1924)
20 July - Pedro Opaso (d. 1957)

Deaths
5 September - Manuel Blanco Encalada (b. 1790)

References 

 
Years of the 19th century in Chile